Amity is an unincorporated community located in Springfield Township, Bucks County, Pennsylvania, United States.

Geography
Amity is located at the intersection of Old Bethlehem Road and Round House Road at coordinates  in Springfield Township, just south of Pleasant Valley.

Amity's zip code is 18951, mail is delivered by the Quakertown post office, telephone service area codes are 215, 267 and 445.

Geology

References

Unincorporated communities in Bucks County, Pennsylvania